The Boston Non-importation agreement was an 18th Century boycott that restricted importation of goods to the city of Boston. This agreement was signed on August 1, 1768 by more than 60 merchants and traders. After two weeks, there were only 16 traders who did not join the effort.

In the upcoming months and years, this non-importation initiative was adopted by other cities: New York joined the same year, Philadelphia followed a year later. Boston stayed the leader in forming an opposition to the mother country and its taxing policy.

This boycott lasted until the 1770 when the British Parliament repealed the acts against which the Boston Non-importation agreement was meant.

Historical context 

The boycott movement in the American colonies had been based on an earlier Irish boycott movement popularised by Irish satirist Jonathan Swift in 1720. The British colony of Ireland had faced similar economic exploitation by Great Britain, Irish Declaratory Act of 1720, which influenced the policies of the British in North America later on, as Ireland was the blueprint for Great Britain's colonies, particularly North America. The American revolutionaries had emulated-inherited an Irish rebellious nature, that wouldn't have been a consideration among the Anglo-Americans at the time. It's therefore evident that the ideological origins of the American revolution are Irish in Origin Throughout the 1760s, the British Parliament was passing many acts which had significant implications on the colonial economy, causing problems in the industry, agriculture and commerce. This means that the Boston Non-importation agreement could not be the first such agreement which opposed the Parliament's behaviour. 

The very first one was triggered by the Parliament's Stamp Act which required the Thirteen Colonies to pay a tax on every piece of paper used. This act had only one goal - raise the funds which would pay for a high debt of British crown, accumulated during the French and Indian War.
The first to protest this taxation were New Yorkers who had embargoed British imports until the Stamp Act was repealed. They were followed by Boston and Philadelphia. Stamp Act was repealed in March 1766 under the pressure from British exporters who were losing their businesses. British Parliament, however, passed many other disliked acts.
 The Declaratory Act assured the strong position of the Parliament in the Thirteen Colonies in the matter of taxing.
 The Quartering Act demanded colonies to support British troops located in colonial America. This was particularly unpopular within the New York Assembly which refused to fund this troop support.
 The Molasses Act put taxes on colonial imports of this syrup.

The act parade proceeded by passing the Townshend Revenue Act in June 1767. It imposed new duties on goods such as salt, glass, paper, tea, coal, oil and lead. The revenue from these duties would be used as a salary for colonial governors, judges and troops.
Accidentally, unlike the Stamp Act, the Townshend Revenue Act attracted significantly less attention and caused hardly any criticism or objection when it was implemented in the late November 1767. This lack of opposition was caused by the fact that only a few (merchants and traders) were affected by this act.

The opposition for the Townshend Act might have never appeared if it had not been of writings of John Dickinson. In his famous " Letters from a Farmer", he argued that these taxes are illegal because the Parliament lacked any authority to impose taxes upon the colonists. These twelve letters were originally published in the Pennsylvania Chronicle and later expanded to more than twenty-four other newspapers around the colonies. The letters, along with Thomas Paine's Common Sense, are considered to be the most popular pamphlets of the Revolutionary era. In these letters, Dickinson fears the loss of colonial independence, considers the recently established acts as an attack on colonial liberties and emphasises the need for colonial protest. In other words, Dickinson's letters boosted up the opposition to the Townshend Act.

Firstly, by addressing James Otis Jr., who advised the Massachusetts House of Representatives to petition the British king. This resulted in the Massachusetts Circular Letter, written by Samuel Adams and James Otis Jr., which was sent to other colonies and recommended collective action against the British Parliament and the Townshend Act.
Such colonial initiatives started a debate, whether the British Parliament has the right to impose taxes with the only intention in raising revenues. The colonial argument, also enforced by Dickinson, was that without elected representants they cannot be taxed ("no taxation without representation"). The counter-argument from the Parliament was a duty to protect their citizens and subjects. These colonial attempts to deny this British policy ended by dissolving New York and Massachusetts assemblies.
As the British government failed to recognize the reason of the colonial objections, a conflict between the mother country and the colony became unavoidable. In these complaints, the Parliament saw a clear attempt to weaken its authority, Navigation Acts, mercantile system and consequently whole empire.
Probably, the only peaceful means left for American colonies pushing through their demands for the British government were boycotts of British goods. These intentions formed into an initiative of Boston merchants and trader which resulted in the Boston Non-importation agreement.

The agreement 
The main purpose of the Boston Non-importation agreement was to protest the Townshend Revenue Act and boycott the majority of British goods. It was signed by Boston merchants and traders on August 1, 1768, and was effective from January 1, the very next year.

As such, it is a brief and relatively straightforward business statement. Nevertheless, the authors did not avoid describing the economic situation and enumerating reasons which had led to the signing of the agreement. The merchants consider the taxes burdensome, frustrating and restrictive for the colonial trade. Moreover, some, led by John Dickinson, argued that the taxes were a violation of their rights. They also expressed a dilemma whether such taxes could be a potential threat to American liberty. Besides thoughts and doubts, the document also contained statements about the trade which the signed merchants agreed upon.
 They would not import any other goods than they already had imported or ordered that fall.
 They would not import any kind of goods from the next year's January. However, they decided to exclude some of the critical supplies, such as salt, coals, fish hooks and lines.
 They strongly refused to import any of the goods, overtaxed by the Townshend Act, mainly tea, glass and paper.
 They would suspend this agreement only if the taxes were removed.

This agreement was aimed at the British Parliament, directly. Nonetheless, the Parliament was not the only one which formed a target of the agreement. Boston businessmen, rather, hoped that their English counterparts would create a pressure on the Parliament so as to avoid a damage, or even worse, a collapse, of the colonial trade which would consequently influence British economy and welfare.

As well as Englishmen, American colonists were an audience for the Boston agreement, too. On one hand, there were traders, merchants, craftsmen and shopkeepers who would enjoy the economic benefits of a successful boycott. On the other hand, in political spheres, it could serve as an example of triumphant opposition to the British. To achieve such a victory, it was crucial that the boycott had been joined by as many traders and merchants as possible, not only in Boston but throughout all the colonies of the New World.

Full text of the Boston Non-importation agreement

Contribution of the Daughters of Liberty 

Even though the participation of Sons of Liberty is undeniable to the matters of non-importation agreements, they were not the only ones who opposed British rule.
During the period of time without British luxury products, tea or textile, there appeared to be an opportunity for patriotic women to play a role in public affairs. Even though they did not join the public protest they formed a strong group called Daughters of Liberty. Instead, they helped to manufacture goods when the non-importation agreements came into effect and caused deficits of British goods, especially textiles. They were spinning wool into yarn, knitting yarn into cloth.
They also decided to join the initiative of boycotting English tea, and instead of it, used different herbs and plants like mint or raspberry. Many times, these women run either a household or even a small shop. So they could make a choice of which goods to buy and which to boycott. Consequently, they had a huge impact on the non-importations and its effectiveness.

Impact of the agreement 

As a reaction to the boycott, the British Parliament expressed an anger and frustration that the colonists denied British authority in taxing matters which was in direct contrast with the Declaratory Act, legislated by the Parliament on the ashes of the annulled Stamp Act.

The Boston merchants and traders reduced their imports of British goods by almost a half. Unfortunately, the other port cities and colonies themselves failed to adopt the non-importation policy of Boston merchants what consequently undermined the effort of their boycott. This failure in cooperation meant that the trade between England and the colonies was sufficient enough. British merchants had sensed no threat in this weak effort and did not lobby for dropping the Townshend Act.

It was not very far in history when an embargo against the Stamp Act, a very similar one to the Boston boycott was a success. The real threat of trade interruption made the English traders press on the Parialemnt and repeal the Stamp Act. Boston merchants might have hoped that such tactics would work out also this time. 
Main reasons why the Boston boycott was not a success as they had probably expected were two.
 First, as stated before, during the Boston boycott, the decrease in trade was not as significant as before.
 Second, the British merchant community felt offended by colonial merchants because they believed that the colonists had not expressed enough gratitude for British merchants' role in the repeal of the Stamp Act.

All in all, the Boston Non-importation agreement cannot be considered a huge success. Firstly, not many colonies had signed up to this boycott. For example, southern colonies refused to take any part in this initiative. Secondly, self-interests, smuggling and breaches of the agreement by many merchants and traders also from Boston undermined the initiative even more.

One of such cheating importers was John Hancock, who was a merchant, statesman, and a patriot of the American Revolution. He had his captains' transport goods which were prohibited by the agreement. His ships carried cargo such as British linen or gunpowder. Another known smuggler was Samuel Adams, also a well known American statesman, who later became one of the organizers of Boston Tea Party. These smuggling practices were not only an effective means of resisting high taxes of Britain and weakening its policies but also a cheaper alternative for desired goods. The illegal goods were obtained, in particular, from the Dutch, French and Spanish traders and merchants.

By a change in Great Britain ministry's foreign policy, which wanted a promotion of trade, export and manufacturing, the Townshend Act was repeal, only partially, though. Subsequently, the colonists partially repealed their own non-importation policies.
The duties imposed on many goods were lowered, except for tea. The Parliament also maintained its right to tax the colonies.
The fact that the Townshend duty stayed in effect for tea, in addition to the Tea Act, which objected to reducing amounts of tea stored in London warehouses, resulted in the later so-called Boston Tea Party.

Economical impact 
In the beginning, let's draw a table, displaying an average import of linens and cotton to Philadelphia.

These figures show how the state of affairs affected the trade. A great depression can be seen in the years of 1760s when the majority of non-importation and taxes battle struggled.
Nonetheless, it is suggested that the non-importation and connected depression was not caused only by the unpopular acts. In this period of time, the creditors and investors asked for their money back from the colonial importers who were unable to pay their debts.
To gather more money they made up the nonimportation so that they could sell their stock at the higher prices.

Not only had the non-importation agreements helped to repeal unwanted acts, but they also supported bring down in the exchange rates and clear the stuffed inventories of the importers.

Conclusion 
All the struggle over the 1760s can be seen as a tough commitment of the Colonials for economic and political independence, an attempt to remove, what they considered, illegal taxes and duties.
One of such attempts was the Boston Non-importation agreement which, even though, not an enormous success, also contributed to this struggle which would later result in more escalated conflicts and later in the American Revolution itself.
One can also conclude that non-importations were also a means to clean the inventories, reset the economics and balance the exchange rates.

References 

1768
1760s conflicts
18th century in the United States